Fauna Entomologica Scandinavica is a scientific book series of entomological identification manuals for insects (and other terrestrial arthropods) in North-West Europe, mainly  Fennoscandia and Denmark. The series is used by a number of groups, such as ecologists, biologists, and insect collectors. The books are in English, and published by the Dutch academic publishing house Brill.

Titles

References

Fauna of Norway
Entomological literature
Science books
Series of books
Fauna of Sweden
Invertebrates of Europe
Fauna of Finland
Brill Publishers books